Sanbor Shullai is an Indian politician. He was elected to the Meghalaya  Legislative Assembly from South Shillong as a  member of the  Bharatiya Janata Party. Previously, he used to be the Deputy Speaker of the Meghalaya Legislative Assembly.

References

Bharatiya Janata Party politicians from Meghalaya
Living people
Year of birth missing (living people)
Meghalaya MLAs 2013–2018
People from Shillong
Meghalaya MLAs 2018–2023
Indian National Congress politicians from Meghalaya
Nationalist Congress Party politicians from Meghalaya
Deputy Speakers of the Meghalaya Legislative Assembly